The 2012 Tashkent Challenger was a professional tennis tournament played on hard courts. It was the fifth edition of the tournament which was part of the 2012 ATP Challenger Tour. It took place in Tashkent, Uzbekistan between 8 and 14 October 2012.

Singles main-draw entrants

Seeds

 1 Rankings are as of October 1, 2012.

Other entrants
The following players received wildcards into the singles main draw:
  Farrukh Dustov
  Sarvar Ikramov
  Sergey Shipilov
  Nigmat Shofayziev

The following players received entry from the qualifying draw:
  Denys Molchanov
  Oleksandr Nedovyesov
  Sanam Singh
  Vishnu Vardhan

Champions

Singles

 Uladzimir Ignatik def.  Lukáš Lacko, 6–3, 7–6(7–3)

Doubles

 Andre Begemann /  Martin Emmrich def.  Rameez Junaid /  Frank Moser, 6–7(2–7), 7–6(7–2), [10–8]

External links
Official Website

Tashkent Challenger
Tashkent Challenger